Narciso Costa (21 June 1903 – 2 February 1966) was a Brazilian sprinter. He competed in the men's 400 metres at the 1924 Summer Olympics.

References

External links
 

1903 births
1966 deaths
Athletes (track and field) at the 1924 Summer Olympics
Brazilian male sprinters
Brazilian male middle-distance runners
Olympic athletes of Brazil
Place of birth missing
20th-century Brazilian people